This is a list of the 18 appointed members of the European Parliament for Bulgaria in the 2004 to 2009 session, from 1 January 2007 to 20 May 2007.

List

2007
List
Bulgaria